Nelson Greene may refer to:

 Nelson Greene (baseball) (1900–1983), pitcher in Major League Baseball
 Nelson Greene (Canadian football), Canadian Football League player
Nelson Greene (artist), American Artist